3 Pashons - Coptic calendar - 5 Pashons

Fixed commemorations
All fixed commemorations below are observed on 4 Pashons (May 12) by the Coptic Orthodox Church.

Saints
Pope John I of Alexandria (221 A.M.), (505 A.D.)
Pope John V of Alexandria (882 A.M.), (1166 A.D.)

Days of the Coptic calendar